Billy Preston & Syreeta is a 1981 album of duets by Billy Preston and Syreeta released by Motown Records. Six songs were produced by Ollie Brown, and four songs were produced and co-written by Michael Masser. An expanded version of the album with 10 songs and 7 bonus cuts was released on CD in late 2013 on SoulMusic Records.

Track listing

Side A 
 "Someone Special" (Greg Beck, Ollie E. Brown, Renee Moore) 4:15
 "Searchin'" (Brown) 4:35
 "Just For You" (Brown, Billy Preston, Michael McGloiry, Syreeta Wright) 5:15
 "It's So Easy" (Carol Connors, David Shire) 3:41
 "A Long and Lasting Love" (Gerry Goffin, Michael Masser) 3:38

Side B 
 "Love" (Michael Masser, Randy Goodrum) 4:06
 "One More Try" (Allee Willis, Lauren Wood) 4:07
 "Hey You" (Billy Preston, Keith Boyd, Jr.) 4:04
 "A New Way to Say I Love You" (Goffin, Masser) 3:00
 "What We Did For Love" (Masser, Goodrum) 2:58
 "With You I'm Born Again" (only orig. LP)

CD bonus cuts 
 "With You I'm Born Again" (US Motown 7" Single)
 "With You I'm Born Again" (instrumental)
 "Go For It"
 "Go For It" (12" mix)
 "It Will Come in Time"
 "One More Time for Love"
 "Please Stay"

Personnel
Billy Preston - vocals, piano, melodica
Syreeta - vocals
Melvin "Wah Wah" Ragin, Michael McGloiry, Mitch Holder, Paul Jackson Jr., Ray Parker Jr., Tim May - guitar
Eddie N. Watkins, Jr., Leland Sklar, Nathan Lamar Watts - bass
Randy Goodrum, Michael Masser, David Shire - piano
Michael Boddicker - synthesiser
John Barnes - keyboards
Ollie E. Brown, Rick Shlosser - drums
Steve Forman - percussion
Eddie "Bongo" Brown - congas
Gary L. Coleman - vibraphone
James Brown - saxophone, flute
Arnel Carmichael, Becky Lopez, Billy Preston, Deborah Thomas, Ginger Blake-Schackne, J.D. Nicholas, James A. Carmichael, Jim Gilstrap, Josie James, Julia Tillman, Linda Dillard, Luthers Waters, Lynn Davis, Maxime Willard Waters, Oren Waters, Sylvia Cox, Syreeta - background vocals
Harry Bluestone - conductor
Jerry Hey - horn arrangements
Michael Masser, David Shire, Barry Fasman, Ollie E. Brown, Sylvester Rivers - rhythm arrangements
Gene Page, David Shire - string arrangements

References

1981 albums
Billy Preston albums
Syreeta albums
Albums arranged by Gene Page
Albums produced by Michael Masser
Motown albums